The following is a list of lakes of Italy. The lakes of Italy can be distinguished, depending on their location within the national territory, between pre-alpine, north-western, Apennine, Sicilian and Sardinian, in addition to lagoons and coastal lakes. They are generally named after the surrounding towns and often their capacity has been increased with the construction of dams, in order to create large water reserves to be used for the production of electricity. There are more than 1000 lakes in Italy, the largest of which is Garda.

The pre-alpine lakes are the largest and most important, because they constitute capacious basins, in which the alpine rivers restrain their impetus and purify their waters, depositing the transported materials. They also affect the local climate, mitigating it. Their waters fill the bottom of long valleys that flow into the Po Valley. They are deep valleys, carved by glaciers, which once descended to the foot of the Alpine chain. Generally, their emissary rivers then flow into the Po River.

There are also lakes along the Italian coasts. They were formed by the wave motion of the sea, which, first of all in the inlets, accumulated sandy shores and dune strings, which closed the waters behind. In this way, the old marine inlets have been transformed into lakes.

Lakes with an area >

Alphabetical

A

 Lake Accesa (Lago dell'Accesa)
 Lake Acerenza (Lago di Acerenza)
 Acquato Lake (Lago Acquato)
 Agnel Lake (Lago Agnel)
 Lake Albano (Lago Albano)
 Alserio Lake (Lago di Alserio)
 Lake Alto del Flumendosa (Lago Alto del Flumendosa)
 Lake of Ampola (Lago d'Ampola)
 Lake Ampollino (Lago Ampollino)
 Lago dell'Ancipa
 Angitola Lake (Lago dell'Angitola)
 Lago di Annone
 Lago di Anterselva
 Lago Arancio
 Lago di Ariamacina
 Lake of Arno (Lago d'Arno)
 Lago Arvo
 Lake Avernus (Lago d'Averno)
 Aviasco lake (Lago di Aviasco)
 Avigliana Lakes (Laghi di Avigliana)

B

 Baccio Lake (Lago Baccio)
 Bagno lakes (Laghi di Bagno)
 Lake Baratz (Lago di Baratz)
 Lago del Barbellino
 Lake of Barbellino Naturale (Lago del Barbellino Naturale)
 Lake Barrea (Lago di Barrea)
 Lake Beauregard (Lago di Beauregard)
 Becco Lake (Lago del Becco)
 Lake of Bianco (Valsesia) (Lago Bianco (Valsesia))
 Lake Bilancino (Lago di Bilancino)
 Biviere Lake (Lago Biviere)
 Lake Bolsena (Lago di Bolsena)
 Lago di Bomba
 Bordaglia Lake (Lago di Bordaglia)
 Lake Bracciano (Lago di Bracciano)
 Lake Braies (Lago di Braies)
 Lake of Brugneto (Lago del Brugneto)
 Lago di Burano
 Lago della Busalletta

C

 Lake Caccamo (Lago di Caccamo)
 Stagno di Cagliari
 Lake Caldaro (Lago di Caldaro)
 Lake Caldonazzo (Lago di Caldonazzo)
 Campelli Lake (Lago Campelli)
 Lake Campotosto (Lago di Campotosto)
 Lago di Canterno
 Lago di Caprolace
 Lake Careser (Lago del Careser)
 Lake Carezza (Lago di Carezza)
 Stagno di Casaraccio
 Lake Casoli (Lago di Casoli)
 Lake Cavazzo (Lago di Cavazzo)
 Lake Cecita (Lago di Cecita)
 Lago di Cei
 Lago di Ceresole
 Lake Chiauci (Lago di Chiauci)
 Lake Chiusi (Lago di Chiusi)
 Lake Cingoli (Lago di Cingoli)
 Lago di Coca
 Lake Coghinas (Lago del Coghinas)
 Colombo Lake (Lago Colombo)
 Lago di Comabbio
 Valli di Comacchio
 Lake Como (Lago di Como or Lario)
 Lake Comunelli (Lago Comunelli)
 Lago di Conza
 Laghetto delle Conche
 Lake Corbara (Lago di Corbara)
 Lake Costalovara (Lago di Costalovara)
 Lake of Cutilia (Lago di Cotilia)

D

 Lake Dietro la Torre (Lago Dietro la Torre)
 Dirillo Lake (Lago Dirillo)
 Disueri Lake (Lago Disueri)
 Lake Dobbiaco (Lago di Dobbiaco)
 Lake Duchessa (Lago della Duchessa)

E

 Lake Endine (Lago di Endine)

F

 Fanaco Lake (Lago Fanaco)
 Lake Favogna (Lago di Favogna)
 Lago di Fiastra
 Lake Fiè (Lago di Fiè)
 Lake Fogliano (Lago di Fogliano)
 Lago di Fondi
 Lake Fontana Bianca (Lago di Fontana Bianca)
 Lake Fortezza (Lago di Fortezza)
 Padule di Fucecchio
 Fusaro Lake (Lago Fusaro)
 Fusine lakes (Laghi di Fusine)

G

 Lago di Ganna
 Garcia Lake (Lago Garcia)
 Lake Garda (Lago di Garda or Benaco)
 Lake Garlate (Lago di Garlate)
 Gattero Lake (Lago del Gattero)
 Gelt Lake (Lago Gelt)
 Gerundo Lake (Lago Gerundo)
 Lago di Ghirla
 Lake Giacopiane (Lago di Giacopiane)
 Lake Gioveretto (Lago di Gioveretto)
 Laghi del Gorzente
 Lago di Guardialfiera
 Gurrida Lake (Lago Gurrida)
 Gusana (Lago di Gusana)

I

 Lake Idro (Lago d'Idro or Eridio)
 Lake Iseo (Lago d'Iseo or Sebino)

L

 Lake Lamar (Lago di Lamar)
 Lame Lake (Lago delle Lame)
 Lake of Lases (Lago di Lases)
 Laghi di Lavagnina
 La Vota Lake (Lago La Vota)
 Lake Ledro (Lago di Ledro)
 Lago di Lentini
 Lake Lesina (Lago di Lesina)
 Lago di Levico
 Lake Liscia (Lago Liscia)
 Lago di Lucrino
 Lake Lugano (Lago di Lugano)
 Lake Lungo (Lago Lungo)

M

 Lake Maggiore (Lago Maggiore or Verbano)
 Lago di Malciaussia
 Lake Malgina (Lago della Malgina)
 Mantova Lakes (Laghi di Mantova)
 Marano Lagoon (Laguna di Marano)
 Marcio Lake (Lago Marcio)
 Lake Martignano (Lago di Martignano)
 Lake Massaciuccoli (Lago di Massaciuccoli)
 Lake Matese (Lago del Matese)
 Maulazzo Lake (Lago Maulazzo)
 Lake Meja (Lago della Meja)
 Lake Mergozzo (Lago di Mergozzo)
 Lake Mezzano (Lago di Mezzano)
 Lago di Mezzola
 Lake Miseno (Lago Miseno)
 Lake Misurina (Lago di Misurina)
 Lake Molveno (Lago di Molveno)
 Lake Monaci (Lago dei Monaci)
 Lake Monastero (Lago di Monastero)
 Monate lake (Lago di Monate)
 Lake of Montedoglio (Lago di Montedoglio)
 Lake Montespluga (Lago di Montespluga)
 Lago di Montepulciano
 Lake Monterosi (Lago di Monterosi)
 Lake Monticolo (Lago di Monticolo)
 Lago di Montorfano
 Lake Morello (Lago Morello)
 Lake Moro (Valle Brembana) (Lago Moro)
 Lake Moro (Valle Camonica) (Lago Moro)
 Lake of Morto (Lago Morto)
 Mucrone Lake (Lago del Mucrone)
 Lake Mulargia (Lago Mulargia)

N

 Nazioni lake (Lago delle Nazioni)
 Lake Nemi (Lago di Nemi)
 Lake Negrisiola (Lago di Negrisiola)
 Lago Nero (Bergamo)
 Lago Nero (Piacenza)
 Lago di Neves
 Lake Nicito (Lago di Nicito)
 Lake Val di Noci (Lago di Val di Noci)
 Nicoletti Lake (Lago Nicoletti)

O

 Lake of Occhito (Lago di Occhito)
 Lago di Ogliastro
 Lake Olginate (Lago di Olginate)
 Lake Olivo (Lago Olivo)
 Lake Omodeo (Lago Omodeo)
 Laguna di Orbetello
 Lake Orta (Lago d'Orta or Cusio)
 Lago di Ortiglieto
 Lake Osiglia (Lago di Osiglia)

P

 Lago di Patria
 Lake Penne (Lago di Penne)
 Lago di Piana degli Albanesi
 Lago delle Piane
 Piano lake (Lago di Piano)
 Lake Pian Palù (Lago di Pian Palù)
 Lake Piatto (Lago Piatto)
 Stagno di Pilo
 Lake Place-Moulin (Lago di Place-Moulin)
 Lago di Piediluco
 Lake of Pietra del Pertusillo (Lago di Pietra del Pertusillo)
 Lake Pietrafitta (Lago di Pietrafitta)
 Lago di Pilato
 Pio Lake (Lago Pio)
 Pergusa Lake (Lago Pergusa)
 Poggio Perotto lake (Lago di Poggio Perotto)
 Stagno di Platamona
 Lake Pontechianale (Lago di Pontechianale)
 Lake Pontesei (Lago di Pontesei)
 Lake Porta (Lago di Porta)
 Lago di Posta Fibreno
 Pozzillo Lake (Lago Pozzillo)
 Lake Prile (Lago Prile)
 Prizzi Lake (Lago di Prizzi)
 Lake Provvidenza (Lago di Provvidenza)
 Lake Puccini (Lago Puccini)
 Lake of Pusiano (Lago di Pusiano)

Q

 Lake Quaira (Lago di Quaira)

R

 Lake of Rascino (Lago di Rascino)
 Ravasanella lake (Lago Ravasanella)
 Lake Resia (Lago di Resia)
 Revine Lago lakes (Laghi di Revine Lago)
 Lake Ripasottile (Lago di Ripasottile)
 Lake Rochemolles (Lago di Rochemolles)
 Lake Rossa (Lago della Rossa)

S

 Lake Sabetta (Lago Sabetta)
 Lake of Salarno (Lago di Salarno)
 Salso Lake (Lago Salso)
 Lago del Salto
 Lago di San Casciano
 San Floriano lake (Lago di San Floriano)
 Lago di San Giuliano
 Lago di San Valentino alla Muta
 Lake Santa Croce (Lago di Santa Croce)
 Santa Croce Lake (Lago di Santa Croce)
 Stagno di Santa Giusta
 Lago di Santa Giustina
 Lago di Santa Rosalia
 Santo Lake (Lago Santo)
 Sassi Neri lake (Laghetto di Sassi Neri)
 Scaffaiolo Lake (Lago Scaffaiolo)
 Lago di Scandarello
 Lago di Scanno
 Lake Scanzano (Lago Scanzano)
 Lago del Segrino
 Lago di Serra del Corvo
 Lago della Serraia
 Serrù Lake (Lago Serrù)
 Lake of Sibolla (Lago di Sibolla)
 Lake Sinizzo (Lago Sinizzo)
 Lake Sirio (Lago Sirio)
 Laghi di Sopranes

T

 Lake of Tafone (Lago del Tafone)
 Lake Talvacchia (Lago di Talvacchia)
 Telese Lake (Lago di Telese)
 Lago di Tenno
 Lake Terlago (Lago di Terlago)
 Terra Nera lake (Laghetto di Terra Nera)
 Lago di Toblino
 Torbido Lake (Lago Torbido)
 Lago di Tovel
 Lake Trasimeno (Lago Trasimeno)
 Trearie Lake (Lago Trearie)
 Lago di Trebecco
 Lake Trinità (Lago della Trinità)
 Lake of Trote (Lago delle Trote)
 Lago del Turano
 Turchino Lake (Lago Turchino)

V

 Lago della Vacca
 Lake Valdaora (Lago di Valdaora)
 Lago di Val di Noci
 Lago di Valdurna
 Lake Valvestino (Lago di Valvestino)
 Lake Varano (Lago di Varano)
 Lake Varese (Lago di Varese)
 Lake Varna (Lago di Varna)
 Lago della Vecchia
 Venetian Lagoon (Laguna di Venezia)
 Lake Ventina (Lago di Ventina)
 Lago di Vernago
 Verney Lake (Lago Verney)
 Lake Vico (Lago di Vico)
 Lago di Viverone

Z

 Lake Zoccolo (Lago di Zoccolo)

Notes

See also

Italian Lakes
Fucine Lake

External links

LIMNO - database della qualità dei laghi italiani 

Italy
Lakes